Laurence Zitvogel is a French physician specializing in oncology and immunology with a large research experience in exosomes and the biological impact of those structures in malignant neoplasms.

Personal life 
Laurence Zitvogel was born in Suresnes, France on 25 December 1963. She has worked with her spouse, Guido Kroemer, since 2001.

Education 
Zitvogel graduated in Medical Oncology from the University of Paris in 1992, and received her Ph.D in Immunology at the University of Pittsburgh Cancer Institute in 1995.

Professional 
Zitvogel became Director of Research for the University of Paris XI in 1998. Her work focuses on intestinal bacterial flora.

Zitvogel directs a research group on tumor immunology and immunotherapy of cancer at the Institut Gustave Roussy where her team has been focused on discovery and validation for antibody combination therapies.

She practices clinical oncology at Villejuif where she is also the Director of the Department of Tumoral Immunology and Immunotherapy.

Zitvogel is a professor at the University of Paris-Sud.

Recognition 
Zeitvogel received the INSERM prize for research in clinical and therapeutic approaches to cancer. She received the first European Society for Medical Oncology (ESMO) award during her lecture titled "Introducing the gut microbiome into the complexity of anticancer immunosurveillance" in 2017, and the Baillet Latour Prize from Belgium in 2018 with her co-researcher Kroemer for their research on mechanisms of cancer immune surveillance.

Jules A. Hoffmann, Nobel prize winner, described her as "one of the most outstanding personalities in the field”.

References

External links 

Women in medicine
French women academics
French oncologists
French immunologists
Women immunologists
Cancer researchers
Immunotherapy
Recipients of the Legion of Honour
1963 births
People from Suresnes
French biologists
University of Paris alumni
Living people